People with the Al-'Amili surname include:

 Bahāʾ al-dīn al-ʿĀmilī
 Muhammad Jamaluddin al-Makki al-Amili
 Zayn al-Din al-Juba'i al'Amili
 Al-Hurr al-Aamili
 Thalaba ibn Salama al-Amili

Arabic-language surnames
Amili